Tim Gould  (born 30 May 1964) is an English former professional racing cyclist specialising in cyclo-cross and mountain bike racing.

Biography
After a string of World Cup victories and podium placings through the early 1990s his strength was climbing and in this era he was the best in the world, becoming the Official World Mountain Bike Hill Climb Champion in 1990 at Durango. Gould was the first human to beat a horse on a mountain bike over cross country terrain in the William Hill Man v Horse v Bike event.

Gould raced for Britain internationally and as a world class pro for the Schwinn Mountain Bike Team, with numerous wins and podium finishes in the Grundig World Cup series. Some of these include first in Chateaux D'oex Switzerland (1991), Second in Mount Snow Vermont (1994) and third at Mammoth Mountain in 1994 behind British Olympian Gary Foord. Gould's early career saw him win an impressive six cyclocross champion titles in the Three Peaks Cyclocross Race. He continued to race cyclocross after retiring from professional and international competition.

Gould was added to the Mountain Bike Hall of Fame in 1999.

In 2009 Gould was inducted into the British Cycling Hall of Fame.

2014 saw Gould make a return to cyclo-cross racing.  Riding for www.zepnat.com he won the Vet 50 category in the Three Peaks (setting a new course record for this category), as well as finding success in the National Trophy series.  Tim capped off his triumphant comeback season with a category win in the National Championships, held at Abergavenny Leisure Centre on 10 January 2015.

Palmarès

MTB

1990
3rd XC,  UCI Mountain Bike World Championships Cross-Country, Durango
1st XC,  UCI Mountain Bike World Championships Hill Climb, Durango
1st Man (Cyclist) ever to beat the Horse, The William Hill Man V Horse V Bike event

1991
1st  XC, British Mountain Biking National Championships
1st XC, Grundig UCI Mountain Bike World Cup, Round 1 – Bassano del Grappa
1st XC, Grundig UCI Mountain Bike World Cup, Final Round – Château-d'Œx
1st XC, Grundig UCI Mountain Bike Challenge Cup, Aviemore

Cyclo-cross

1984
 Three Peaks Cyclo-Cross Champion

1985
 Three Peaks Cyclo-Cross Champion

1986
 Three Peaks Cyclo-Cross Champion

1987
 Three Peaks Cyclo-Cross Champion

1988
 Three Peaks Cyclo-Cross Champion

1989
 Three Peaks Cyclo-Cross Champion

2015
 Vet 50 National Cyclo-Cross Champion

Notes

References
Mountain Bike Hall of Fame

1964 births
Living people
Cyclo-cross cyclists
English male cyclists
Cross-country mountain bikers
Marathon mountain bikers
People from Matlock, Derbyshire
Sportspeople from Derbyshire